The 22nd Grand Prix des Frontières was a non-championship Formula Two motor race held on 1 June 1952 at the Chimay Street Circuit in Chimay, Belgium. The Grand Prix was won by Paul Frère in an HWM-Alta. Ken Downing finished second in a Connaught Type A-Lea Francis and Robin Montgomerie-Charrington was third in an Aston Butterworth. Johnny Claes started from pole in a Simca Gordini Type 15 but crashed out on the first lap.

Classification

Race

References

Grand Prix des Frontières
Frontières
Frontières
Frontières